Melfjorden is a fjord in the municipality of Rødøy in Nordland county, Norway. It is located on the Arctic Circle. There are two fjord arms that branch off the main fjord: Nordfjorden flows to the north into the Saltfjellet–Svartisen National Park and Sørfjorden to the south past the villages of Sørfjorden and Kilboghavn.

The village of Melfjordbotn lies at the eastern end of the fjord in Rødøy municipality, but it is only accessible by road through neighboring Rana.

See also
 List of Norwegian fjords

References

External links

Fjords of Nordland
Rødøy